Nataliya Borysenko (Ukr.: Наталія Борисенко; born December 3, 1975) is a Ukrainian team handball player. She received a bronze medal with the Ukrainian national team at the 2004 Summer Olympics in Athens.

References

External links
 

1975 births
Living people 
Handball players at the 2004 Summer Olympics
Olympic bronze medalists for Ukraine
Olympic medalists in handball
Ukrainian female handball players
Ukrainian expatriate sportspeople in Slovenia
Ukrainian expatriate sportspeople in North Macedonia

Medalists at the 2004 Summer Olympics